The 1897 Stanford football team represented Stanford University in the 1897 college football season and was coached by George H. Brooke in his only year coaching the team. The team played the Reliance Athletic Club team four times and ended the season with its annual Thanksgiving Day game against California, winning 28–0, the biggest margin of victory yet in the seven-year Big Game  series. At this point in the series, Stanford had won 4 and tied 3 with no losses.

Schedule

References

Stanford
Stanford Cardinal football seasons
Stanford football